Goes! is a Japanese female-oriented drama CD developed by Petit Reve and published by Future Tech Lab. The series span 5 volumes with the first one being released on August 27, 2014 and the last one released on November 5, 2016. Between January 27, 2016 and April 20, 2016 four image song albums were also released. On November 25, 2016 Future Tech Lab released an otome visual novel video game adaptation for PlayStation Vita, developed by Petit Reve.

Reception 
Japanese gaming magazine Famitsu gave the PlayStation Vita game a score of three sevens and an eight, for a total of 29 out of 40.

References

External links 
  

2016 video games
Japan-exclusive video games
Otome games
PlayStation Vita games
PlayStation Vita-only games
Video games developed in Japan